The 2014 888.com European Championship was the seventh edition of the Professional Darts Corporation tournament, the European Championship, which sees the top European players to compete against the highest ranked players from the PDC Order of Merit. The tournament took place from 24–26 October 2014 at the RWE-Sporthalle in Mülheim, Germany.

Adrian Lewis was the defending champion, having beaten Simon Whitlock in the final of the 2013 tournament, but he lost in the first round to Jelle Klaasen.

En route to the final, Michael van Gerwen hit a nine-dart finish in his semi-final match against Raymond van Barneveld. He went on to win the tournament, securing his first European Championship title, after beating Terry Jenkins 11–4.

Prize money
The 2014 European Championship had a total prize fund of £250,000, a £50,000 increase since the previous staging of the tournament. The following is the breakdown of the fund:

Qualification
The top 16 players from the PDC Order of Merit on 13 October automatically qualified for the event. The top eight non-qualified players from the Pro Tour Order of Merit were added to the tournament. The remaining places were filled by European qualifiers, with the top seven players from the European Order of Merit and a Scandinavian qualifier. The top eight from the PDC Order of Merit were seeded in the tournament.

These were the participants:

Draw
The draw was held on 12 October 2014.

Broadcasting
On 14 June 2013, the PDC announced that the European Championship would be broadcast in the United Kingdom on ITV4 for the next three years. The tournament was available in the following countries on these channels:

References

External links
 Official site

European Championship (darts)
European Championship
European Championship